Carles Domingo Pladevall (born 10 June 1977), known as Mingo, is a Spanish former professional footballer who played as a left back.

A FC Barcelona youth product, he appeared in 279 Segunda División matches over 11 seasons, mainly with Gimnàstic (five years) and Barcelona B (three). He added in 134 and one goal in La Liga, where he represented the former club and also Sporting de Gijón, Rayo Vallecano, Betis and Albacete.

Club career
Born in Hostalric, Girona, Catalonia, Mingo began his football career in FC Barcelona's youth system. Playing alongside Albert Celades and Iván de la Peña, he won the 1994 División de Honor and the Copa del Rey Juvenil; already a senior, he spent three seasons with the club's B-team.

Mingo was released in the summer of 1997, moving to Sporting de Gijón and making his La Liga debut that season as the Asturias side were finally relegated. After two seasons he returned to the top flight with Rayo Vallecano, where his good performances attracted attention from Real Betis, with a good first campaign being followed by two subpar ones (in his last year, however, he scored his first goal in the top level, a 2–1 away win against RCD Espanyol on 25 January 2004).

In 2004, Mingo moved to Albacete Balompié, playing one season each in the first and second divisions – in his second year, he was sent off three times. In 2006–07 he returned to his region of birth, signing with Gimnàstic de Tarragona and appearing in 16 league games in a season that ended in top-tier relegation.

Veteran Mingo was regularly used by Nàstic in the following four second division campaigns, featuring in a minimum of 21 and a maximum of 29 league matches. He was released at the end of 2011–12, with the club suffering relegation.

Honours
Spain U18
UEFA European Under-18 Championship: 1995

References

External links

1977 births
Living people
People from Selva
Sportspeople from the Province of Girona
Spanish footballers
Footballers from Catalonia
Association football defenders
La Liga players
Segunda División players
Tercera División players
FC Barcelona C players
FC Barcelona Atlètic players
Sporting de Gijón players
Rayo Vallecano players
Real Betis players
Albacete Balompié players
Gimnàstic de Tarragona footballers
Spain youth international footballers
Spain under-23 international footballers